West of the Pesos is a 1960 Warner Bros. Merrie Melodies cartoon short directed by Robert McKimson. The short was released on January 23, 1960, and stars Speedy Gonzales and Sylvester.

In this film, Speedy interrupts his vacation in order to rescue laboratory mice from captivity.

Plot
At the ACME Laboratorio por Experimento, captured mice are imprisoned in cages, worrying about their fates in scientific experiments. As the mice engage in various activities such as card games and playing the harmonica, Sylvester marches outside as the guard cat, discouraging any mouse that would dare escape. In the village, the señorita mice are crying about family members and boyfriends having gone missing (the name of one of the missing mice also happens to be that of one of the animators, Manuel Perez---although not an animator on this short).

The mayor of the village attempts to recruit volunteers to help rescue their villagers, but realize the situation is hopeless because Sylvester is too fast and smart for them. Then, one of the mice suggests calling on Speedy Gonzales to help with the rescue effort. After realizing that he is on vacation in Guadalajara, another mouse comments that Speedy "would come all the way from Guadalajara to visit my seester Carmela." With that, Carmela is recruited to place a long-distance call to Speedy; seconds after the call is placed, Speedy races to the village to begin the rescue effort.

Speedy walks into the patio to great fanfare, much like a bullfighter before his fight, drawing Sylvester's attention. The mouse directly taunts the "gringo pussy gato," and Sylvester—perhaps thinking Speedy is the latest attempted would-be rescuer in an apparent long line of hapless victims—sarcastically obliges. Speedy instantly races past Sylvester and rescues Manuel (nicknamed Manuelito); the cat's attempt to snare them in a rope trap fails, as Speedy's quick pace pulls Sylvester through the knothole of the wall he is hiding behind.

Sylvester's other encounters with Speedy include:
 The cat's attempt to crush Speedy with a large rock (Speedy yells "Yee-haw!" causing Sylvester to drop the rock on himself). Speedy then smuggles out several more mice in a tin can and hides behind another rock and in between three cans. Sylvester looks under all three cans, the final one concealing a dynamite stick that explodes in his face as the mice make their getaway.
 Speedy sneaking out several more mice using a dachshund costume. One of the mice briefly is separated from the group, but is able to catch up, and Sylvester crashes into the fence.
 Speedy using a set of train tracks and cars to bring the rest of the mice home. Sylvester tries to hide behind a tunnel along the tracks, but the train simply goes through the cat's body and exits through his tail. The cat cries in frustration. Here, Speedy refers to the escape as like "Atchison, Tabasco, and Santa Fe", a pun on the song On the Atchison, Topeka and the Santa Fe.

In the closing scene, Speedy is hailed as a hero and gets a big kiss from Carmela. Speedy goes wild and blasts into outer space. The other mice laugh, commenting that he is now a "loco satellite."

See also
 List of American films of 1960

References

External links
 

1960 animated films
1960 short films
Merrie Melodies short films
Warner Bros. Cartoons animated short films
Speedy Gonzales films
Sylvester the Cat films
Films directed by Robert McKimson
Films scored by Milt Franklyn
1960 films
Animated films about mice
Animated films about cats
Films set in Mexico
1960s Warner Bros. animated short films
1960s English-language films
Films about animal testing